The 2005 Arizona Wildcats baseball team represented the University of Arizona during the 2005 NCAA Division I baseball season. The Wildcats played their home games at Jerry Kindall Field at Frank Sancet Stadium. The team was coached by Andy Lopez in his 4th season at Arizona. The Wildcats finished with a record of 39-22 (17-7 Conf.) and were selected to the NCAA Tournament for the 3rd straight year and 3rd time under Andy Lopez, losing in the Fullerton Regional final to Cal State Fullerton.

Previous season 
The Wildcats finished the 2004 season with a record of 36-27-1 (12-12 Conf.). Arizona advanced to the postseason for a 2nd straight year, winning the South Bend Regional and Long Beach Super Regional on the way to making their first College World Series appearance since their championship-winning 1986 season. This would also mark Andy Lopez's 4th appearance in the World Series as a coach, his first since leading the Florida Gators to the 1998 College World Series.

Personnel

Roster

Coaches

Schedule and results

Fullerton Regional

2005 MLB Draft

References 

Arizona
Arizona Wildcats baseball seasons
Arizona baseball